

Events
New York mobster Joe Adonis leaves Brooklyn eventually moving to Palisades Park, New Jersey.
January 14 - Benjamin "Zookie the Bookie" Zuckerman, a member of the Chicago syndicate involved in illegal gambling, is killed.
March 4 - Emmanuel "Mendy" Weiss, a syndicate hitman and a suspected gunman in the murder of Dutch Schultz, is executed.
March 4 – Murder, Inc. leader Louis Buchalter is sent to the electric chair and executed by the state of New York. He is the last member of Murder, Inc. to be executed.
April 22 – Frank Abatte, a major racketeer of Calumet City, Illinois who has been missing since Feb. 24, is found murdered near Hot Springs, Arkansas.
April 23 – Rocco Perri disappeared, and his body never found
August 6 - Chicago Outfit enforcer William Daddano, Sr. arrested for attempted robbery of three million war ration stamps.
August 7 – Vito Genovese, eluding U.S. authorities for over a decade following his indictment for the 1934 murder of Ferdinand Boccia, is finally apprehended in Italy and deported back to the United States to stand trial. However, shortly after his arrival on June 1, 1945, the governments star witness dies of an "overdose of sedatives" while in protective custody.  Genovese was eventually acquitted of charges on June 10, 1946.
September 16 – Leaders of the Blocco del popolo (The Popular Front) in Sicily, the communist Girolamo Li Causi and socialist Michele Pantaleone, went to speak to the landless labourers at an election rally in Villalba, challenging Mafia boss Calogero Vizzini in his own personal fiefdom. Li Causi denounced the unjust exploitation of the peasantry by the Mafia. The rally ended in a shoot-out which left 18 people wounded including Li Causi and Pantaleone. In the following years, left-wing leaders in Sicily were killed or otherwise attacked, culminating in the killing of 11 people and the wounding of over thirty at the May 1, 1947, labour parade in "Portella di Ginestra", the vale between three villages. The attack was attributed to the bandit and separatist leader Salvatore Giuliano. However, the Mafia was suspected of involvement in many of the attacks on left wing labour leaders.
October 19 – Cleveland crime syndicate Alfred "Big Al" Polizzi pleads guilty for failing to pay federal liquor taxes and, following his release from prison in 1945, retires to Coral Gables, Florida. John Scalish assumes Polizzi's role as head of the Cleaveland family, shortly after Polizzi's imprisonment.

Births
March 22 – Anthony Pellicano, Los Angeles private investigator
December 9 – Tadashi Irie, a prominent yakuza related to the Takumi-gumi and its parent syndicate, the Yamaguchi-gumi
Salvatore Inzerillo, Palermo mafioso, captain of the Passo di Rigano family
Paul Schiro "Paulie", Chicago Outfit gambling racketeer
Michael Spilotro, Chicago Outfit associate and brother of Anthony and Victor Spilotro

Deaths
January 14 – Benjamin Zuckerman "Zookie the Bookie", a.k.a. "Little Zukie", Chicago syndicate mobster involved in illegal gambling
March 4 – Louis Buchalter, Murder, Inc. leader
March 4 – Louis Capone, Murder, Inc. hitman
March 4 – Emanuel Weiss, Murder, Inc. hitman and member of the Luciano crime family
April 22 – Frank Abatte, Illinois mobster (body discovered)
November 28 – Frank Todaro, New Orleans crime family leader

References 

Organized crime
Years in organized crime